Skowronki  is a village in Gmina Gostyń, Gostyń County, Greater Poland Voivodeship, Poland.

References

Skowronki